Johan Gustaf Ruckman (December 12, 1780 – January 20, 1862) was a Swedish engraver.

Biography
Ruckman was born in Stockholm in 1780.

In 1805, being a pupil of Johan Wilhelm Palmstruch, Ruckman helped with the preparation of tables in Palmstruch's work Svensk botanik ("Swedish Botany"). From the fifth volume of this series, he designed several pages independently. At the same time he helped Palmstruch and Conrad Quensel with the preparation of Svensk zoologi ("Swedish Zoology"). From the seventh volume of Svensk Botanik (1812) until the completion of the eleventh volume (1838), Ruckman personally engraved all the printing plates. Ruckman found time to further develop his artistry and designed a number of portraits. He also illustrated fashion journals, calendars, and children's books; writings of the Swedish Academy of Sciences and other scientific institutions; and about 100 map sheets. Ruckman is well represented in the collection of engravings of the Swedish National Museum.

Selected works

Portraits
 Franzén
 K.P. Hagberg
 A. Hylander
 Ph. von Mecklenburg
 Tegnér
 J. Tengström
 Thunberg
 Wallin

Books and data tables
 Desseins et croquis des plus célèbres maîtres (1 Heft, 1820)
 Scener ur Fredmans epistlar och sånger (1827–28), drawings by E. Chiewitz
 Archiv för nyare resor (1810–11)
 Jorden och dess invånare af Zimmermann (1813–39)

References

Swedish engravers
1780 births
1862 deaths